Haruna Doda (born 16 January 1975 in Lagos, Nigeria) is a professional footballer currently playing for Maltese Second Division side Zebbug Rangers, where he plays as a midfielder.

External links
 

Living people
1975 births
Nigerian footballers
Nigerian expatriate footballers
C.D. Santa Clara players
Birkirkara F.C. players
Hibernians F.C. players
Marsaxlokk F.C. players
Għajnsielem F.C. players
St. Patrick F.C. players
Nigerian expatriate sportspeople in Malta
Dingli Swallows F.C. players
Bendel Insurance F.C. players
Expatriate footballers in Malta
Rangers International F.C. players
C.D. Aves players
Association football forwards
Association football midfielders
Nigeria international footballers